Tourist Trophy may refer to:
 Isle of Man TT, the original Tourist Trophy motorcycle racing event
 RAC Tourist Trophy, the longest awarded prize in motorsports
 Dutch TT at Assen, a MotoGP event
 Eifelrennen (German TT), held until 1974 as a combined motorcycle/automobile event
 Australian Tourist Trophy, held on and off since 1956
 Australian Tourist Trophy (for motorcycles), unrelated to the above and held on and off between 1914 and 1996
 1936 Australian Tourist Trophy, a one-off race unrelated to the Australian Tourist Trophy
 Tourist Trophy (video game), a 2006 motorcycle game for the PlayStation 2
 Audi TT, a sports car named for Tourist Trophy

See also 
 TT (disambiguation)
 Grand Prix (disambiguation), a name sometimes used for competitions or sport events, alluding to the winner receiving a prize, trophy or honour